Cyrus Sol Malis (February 26, 1907 – January 12, 1971) was a Major League Baseball pitcher who played in one game for the Philadelphia Phillies on August 17, 1934. He was born in Philadelphia, Philadelphia, where he attended Brown Prep, and was  Jewish.

Baseball career
Malis pitched 3.2 innings for the Phillies, and gave up two earned runs. He ended his career with a 4.91 ERA (104 ERA+ on the season). He walked two batters as well. On defense, he made one putout, zero errors or assists, giving him a career fielding percentage of 1.000. In addition to a perfect fielding percentage, he was hit by a pitch in his only plate appearance to give him a perfect on-base percentage.

References

External links

1907 births
1971 deaths
Philadelphia Phillies players
Baseball players from Pennsylvania
Jewish American baseball players
Jewish Major League Baseball players
Northampton Red Sox players
20th-century American Jews